The National League Riders' Championship is an annual motorcycle speedway contest between the top riders (or two riders) with the highest average points total from each club competing in the third tier league in the United Kingdom.

The same format of Championship applies for the tier one and tier two leagues, that of the SGB Premiership Riders' Individual Championship (tier one) and the SGB Championship Riders' Individual Championship (tier two).

Winners

See also
List of United Kingdom Speedway League Riders' champions
 Speedway in the United Kingdom

References

Speedway competitions in the United Kingdom